Letchworth is a former railway station that was located on the Bombala railway line.

It was named Letchworth, after Letchworth Garden City. The name was suggested by land developer H. F. Halloran. It was located at an unrealised Halloran residential sub-division, also named Letchworth. The station would have also served another of his sub-divisions, Environa, if either of the sub-divisions had been developed.

Reference section

External links section

 NSW Railnet - Letchworth

Disused regional railway stations in New South Wales
Bombala railway line 
Railway stations in Australia opened in 1926
Regional railway stations in New South Wales